Vera Kuzminichna Vasilyeva (born 30 September 1925) is a Soviet and Russian movie and stage actress. She was honored with People's Artist of the USSR in 1986. She was twice awarded the Stalin Prize in 1948 and in 1951. She's known for her roles in Bride with a Dowry (1953) and Adventures of a Dentist (1965).

Career
In 1943, Vasilyeva entered the Moscow City Drama School for a course with Vladimir Gotovtsev.

In 1945, Vasilyeva debuted in cinema. Then she got a bit part in the movie The Call of Love. The first big role was offered in 1947, when she played the role of Anastasia Gusenkova in the film Ballad of Siberia.

Personal life
Vasilyeva was born in Moscow. She was married to actor Vladimir Ushakov (1920—2011) between 1956 and 2011, until his death. They had no children.

Roles in other theaters

Selected filmography
 The Call of Love (1945) as fitter (uncredited)
Ballad of Siberia (1947) as Anastasia Petrovna Gusenkova
 Bride with a Dowry (1953) as Olga Stepanovna Stepanova
 Chuk and Gek (1953) as Mother
 Adventures of a Dentist (1965) as Lyudmila Ivanovna Lastochkina
Umka is Looking for a Friend (1970) as The Mother Bear (voice)
We Didn't Learn This (1975) as Natalia Ivanovna
The Age of Innocence (1976) as Polina Borisovna
Adventures of Vasya Kurolesov (1981) as Vasya's mother (voice)
Carnival (1981) as Nikita's mother
Married Bachelor (1982) as Marya Semyonovna
To Marry a Captain (1985) as Vera Semyonovna Zhuravlyova
 Dandelion Wine (1997) as Esther Spaulding

References

External links

 
 Официальный сайт Веры Кузьминичны Васильевой 
 Вера Васильева: хотелось всего, что казалось красиво / Интервью провела Наталия Орлова // КоммерсантЪ. 1997. 16 августа. № 134 (1316) .

1925 births
Living people
20th-century Russian actresses
21st-century Russian actresses
Academicians of the National Academy of Motion Picture Arts and Sciences of Russia
Actresses from Moscow
Communist Party of the Soviet Union members
Honored Artists of the RSFSR
People's Artists of the RSFSR
People's Artists of the USSR
Stalin Prize winners
Recipients of the Order "For Merit to the Fatherland", 2nd class
Recipients of the Order "For Merit to the Fatherland", 3rd class
Recipients of the Order "For Merit to the Fatherland", 4th class

Recipients of the Order of Honour (Russia)
Recipients of the Order of the Red Banner of Labour
Russian film actresses
Russian stage actresses
Russian television actresses
Russian voice actresses
Soviet film actresses
Soviet stage actresses
Soviet television actresses
Soviet voice actresses